Under German law, the registered design (German: eingetragenes Design), formerly called Geschmacksmuster ("aesthetic model"), is a form of intellectual property that extends industrial design rights over the visual design of objects that is not purely utilitarian.  The term of a Geschmacksmuster is twenty-five years (§ 27 (2) GeschmMG), as it is for a community design.

See also
 Design patent
 Deutsches Patent- und Markenamt (German Patent and Trade Mark Office)
 EU Directive on the legal protection of designs
 Gebrauchsmuster (German utility model)
Trade dress

References

External links
 Designs at the Deutsches Patent- und Markenamt (German Patent and Trade Mark Office)
  Deutsches Geschmacksmustergesetz (German Design Patent Law)

German intellectual property law
Industrial design